Anisothrix adustalis is a species of snout moth. It is found in Peru.

References

Moths described in 1891
Chrysauginae
Moths of South America